This is a list of the 5 observers to the European Parliament for Malta in the 1999 to 2004 session. They were appointed by the Maltese Parliament as observers from 1 May 2003 until the accession of Malta to the EU on 1 May 2004.

List

Malta
List
2003
Malta